The Kondoma (Qondum) is a river in Kemerovo Oblast, Russia. It is left tributary of the Tom. The towns of Tashtagol, Osinniki and Kaltan are situated by the Kondoma. Its main tributaries are the Mundybash, Tesh, and Telbes rivers. It flows into the Tom in Novokuznetsk.

References

Rivers of Kemerovo Oblast